The Blue Man is a mystery, science fiction novel written by American author Kin Platt. It is the first in the four-book Steve Forrester series. It was released by Harper Books in 1961 and reissued by Twin Lakes Press in 2005.

Plot summary
Steve Forrester is a teenager who goes to live for a summer with his aunt and uncle, who run a rural motel.

On his first day running the desk by himself, a strange man checks in, dressed in a scarf, hat, trench coat and gloves, unusual attire for summer.  The light on the desk starts to flicker as the man signs in with an illegible scrawl.  Later, Steve brings a towel to the stranger's room and sees something that launches him on an unusual and singular adventure:  the man's skin is bright blue and he seems to be draining energy from a nearby lamp.

After his uncle is seemingly murdered by the fleeing Blue Man (who appears to possibly be of alien origin), Steve sets out on a cross-country search for justice and revenge.

Steve Forrester books by Kin Platt 
The Blue Man (Harper, 1961)
Sinbad and Me (Chilton, 1966)
The Mystery of the Witch Who Wouldn't (Chilton, 1969)
The Ghost of Hellsfire Street (Delacorte, 1980)

1961 American novels
1961 science fiction novels
American mystery novels
American science fiction novels
American children's novels
Children's mystery novels
Children's science fiction novels
Novels set in hotels
Harper & Row books
1961 children's books